Chike Aniakor (born 1939) is a Nigerian painter. A native of Abatete, Aniakor received his first artistic training at Ahmadu Bello University, receiving his master's degree in 1974. He received a doctorate in art history from Indiana University Bloomington in 1978, writing his dissertation on Igbo architecture.  He has taught art and art history at the University of Nigeria, Nsukka, since 1970, becoming a member of the Nsukka group. Presently a Professor at the University of Cross River State teaching Arts and Contemporary African Art. More recently, he has been a fellow of the Metropolitan Museum of Art and of Howard University.

Along with Uche Okeke, Aniakor was among the first Nsukka artists to develop an interest in uli, and his drawings and watercolors display a strong affinity to the system.  His human figures frequently possess elongated bodies and limbs, and he often makes use of negative space.  His subjects are mainly drawn from Igbo culture and from the Biafran War.  More recently his art has become more concerned with Nigerian social conditions.

References
Bio from the National Museum of African Art

1939 births
Living people
Artists from Anambra State
Igbo painters
Academic staff of the University of Nigeria
20th-century Nigerian painters
21st-century Nigerian painters
Indiana University Bloomington alumni